The O'Rourke–McFadden Trophy was created in 2008 by the Boston College Gridiron Club to commemorate the tradition at Clemson and Boston College while honoring the legacy of Charlie O'Rourke and Banks McFadden.  O'Rourke and McFadden are members of the College Football Hall of Fame who played during the leather helmet era. Since the trophy's inception in 2008, the club has presented it to every winner of a Boston College-Clemson football game.

Trophy history
The Boston College Gridiron Club commissioned the trophy to honor the relationship between Clemson and Boston College that began , in early 1940, and to recognize the support of Tiger fans in welcoming Boston College to the ACC, which BC joined in 2005.

The trophy features two leather helmet replicas of those used by O’Rourke of Boston College and McFadden of Clemson, when they competed against each other in the 1940 Cotton Bowl in Dallas, Texas. In addition to the trophy presentation, the Boston College Gridiron Club presents a replica leather helmet to the MVP of the winning school. The helmet will reflect the colors of the winning team.

Namesakes
Charlie O’Rourke led Boston College from the quarterback position to a  record in his three years (1938–40). One of those three losses was to McFadden and Clemson in the 1940 Cotton Bowl. O'Rourke went on to play quarterback and defensive back for the Chicago Bears, Los Angeles Dons, and Baltimore Colts. After two years as an NFL coach, he coached at Massachusetts (1952–59). O’Rourke later served as commissioner of the Pop Warner League, a national organization of junior football teams.  His jersey was retired at Boston College and he was inducted into the College Football Hall of Fame in 1972.

Banks McFadden led the Tigers to a 9–1 record in 1939 as the starting quarterback. He was an All-American in football and basketball at Clemson. The 1939 football team finished 12th in the final AP poll (early December), for Clemson’s first top 20 season on record, and the win over Boston College in the Cotton Bowl was Clemson’s first bowl appearance. In the spring of 1939, he led Clemson to the Southern Conference Basketball championship. McFadden was Clemson’s first inductee into the College Football Hall of Fame in 1959. He was the fourth overall pick of the 1940 NFL Draft by the Brooklyn Dodgers. After one year in the NFL and a stint in the Army Air Corps during World War II, he returned to Clemson and held coaching positions in football, basketball, and track. McFadden became the first coach in college basketball history to improve his conference wins in five consecutive seasons.

Game results

References

College football rivalries in the United States
College football rivalry trophies in the United States
Boston College Eagles football
Clemson Tigers football